The Battle of Mstislavl took place on 4 November 1501 between the forces of the Grand Duchy of Lithuania and the forces of the Grand Duchy of Moscow and Principality of Novgorod-Seversk. The Lithuanian forces were defeated.

The Muscovite–Lithuanian Wars renewed in 1500. In 1501, Ivan III of Russia sent a new force under the command of  towards Mstislavl. Local princes Mstislavsky together with Ostap Dashkevych organized the defense and were badly beaten on 4 November. They retreated to Mstislavl and Mozhayskiy decided not to attack the castle. Instead, Russian forces besieged the city and pillaged surrounding areas.

Lithuanians organized a relief force, brought by Great Hetman Stanislovas Kęsgaila. Neither Mozhayskiy nor Kęsgaila dared to attack and the Russian forces retreated without a battle.

References

Battles involving Russia
Battles involving the Grand Duchy of Lithuania
1501 in Europe
Conflicts in 1501
Military history of Belarus